Pablo Bernardo Dabezies Antía, also known as Paul Dabezies (6 July 1940 – 28 August 2021) was a Uruguayan theologian and Roman Catholic priest.

Selected works 
  (with Teresa Porzecanski, Gerardo Caetano, and other authors)

References 

1940 births
2021 deaths
Pontifical Gregorian University alumni
20th-century Uruguayan Roman Catholic priests
21st-century Uruguayan Roman Catholic priests
Uruguayan human rights activists
Uruguayan theologians
People from Montevideo